Roland Robinson (1949, Detroit, Michigan – November 8, 2004, Memphis, Tennessee) was a longtime Memphis studio session bass player and songwriter. Robinson was a cousin and close friend of Teenie Hodges, Al Green's lead guitarist in the 1970s when Green recorded with the famed Hi Records staff band, the Hi Rhythm Section.

Robinson played for several years with Stax stars like Eddie Floyd and once jammed with Jimi Hendrix, Buddy Miles Express' guitarist Jim McCarty and Jimi Hendrix' drummer Mitch Mitchell, a heavily edited recording of which was released as 'Jimi/Jimmy Jam' on the posthumous compilation Jimi Hendrix album Nine to the Universe which features other heavily edited, disparate studio jams with widely varying personnel, recorded over the span of six months during 1969, that producer Alan Douglas (although not involved in the original recordings, but was himself a jazz producer from the early sixties, and also a compiler, and editor of other posthumous compilation releases of some note.) considered exemplified Hendrix' jazz leanings. 
He regularly performed and recorded on albums for a few years with the late rock and funk drummer Buddy Miles, who had previously played with Mike Bloomfield and Jimi Hendrix,  (although not the same one as Robinson and was recorded two months later), prior to developing a solo career.

He worked as a songwriter and performer in 1973 in a group called The New Cactus Band with Duane Hitchings (an original member of Buddy Miles Express, who was also recorded jamming with Hendrix (but quite sporadically, over at least two years), although, (unlike Robinson) he was edited out of the only official release of his jams by Alan Douglas, and this "fame" has to rely on the untampered, bootlegs of the original recordings), the sole member from the final lineup of the Cactus band, which had disbanded in 1972. They released one album on Atco, disbanding shortly thereafter.  His rock and roll band Quo Jr. ("The Son Of What's Happening"), composed of veteran R&B players including The New Cactus Band drummer Jerry Norris, opened one show for the Sex Pistols' notorious first U.S. tour at the Taliesyn Ballroom in Memphis in 1978, performing regularly for several years into the 1980s. Hitchings and Robinson, who also worked together in a group called Steel, later collaborated to write Rod Stewart's 1984 hit song, "Infatuation." Robinson recorded with the Mar-Keys and blues great Willie Cobbs, among others.

References

1949 births
2004 deaths
Songwriters from Michigan
20th-century American bass guitarists
Guitarists from Michigan
Tav Falco's Panther Burns members